Jacques de Germigny was French Ambassador to the Ottoman Empire from 1579 to 1585. He succeeded to Gilles de Noailles as ambassador. He was sent to the Ottoman Empire by Henry III of France. He was succeeded by Jacques Savary de Lancosme.

During his tenure, the Ottoman ambassador Ali Aga, went to France to visit Henry III of France and bring him the renewal of the Franco-Ottoman Capitulations.

See also
 Franco-Ottoman alliance

Notes

Ambassadors of France to the Ottoman Empire
16th-century French diplomats
16th-century French people